Caratacus (Brythonic *Caratācos, Middle Welsh Caratawc; Welsh Caradog; Breton Karadeg; Greek Καράτακος; variants Latin Caractacus, Greek Καρτάκης) was a 1st-century AD British chieftain of the Catuvellauni tribe, who resisted the Roman conquest of Britain.

Before the Roman invasion, Caratacus is associated with the expansion of his tribe's territory. His apparent success led to Roman invasion, nominally in support of his defeated enemies. He resisted the Romans for almost a decade, mixing guerrilla warfare with set-piece battles, but was unsuccessful in the latter. After his final defeat he fled to the territory of Queen Cartimandua, who captured him and handed him over to the Romans. He was sentenced to death as a military prisoner, but made a speech before his execution that persuaded the Emperor Claudius to spare him.

The legendary Welsh character Caradog ap Bran and the legendary British king Arvirargus may be based upon Caratacus. Caratacus's speech to Claudius has been a common subject in art.

Name
Caratacus's name appears as both Caratacus and Caractacus in manuscripts of Tacitus, and as Καράτακος and Καρτάκης in manuscripts of Dio. Older reference works tend to favour the spelling "Caractacus", but modern scholars agree, based on historical linguistics and source criticism, that the original Common Brittonic form was *Karatākos, pronounced , cognate with Welsh Caradog, Breton Karadeg, and Irish Carthach, meaning "loving, beloved, dear; friend".

History

Claudian invasion
Caratacus is named by Dio Cassius as a son of the Catuvellaunian king Cunobelinus.  Based on coin distribution Caratacus appears to have been the protégé of his uncle Epaticcus, who expanded Catuvellaunian power westwards most likely from his palace in Verulam the heartland of the Catuvellauni into the territory of the Atrebates. After Epaticcus died in about AD 35, the Atrebates, under Verica, regained some of their territory, but it appears Caratacus completed the conquest, as Dio tells us Verica was ousted, fled to Rome and appealed to the emperor Claudius for help. This was the excuse used by Claudius to launch his invasion of Britain in the summer of 43. The invasion targeted Caratacus's stronghold of Camulodunon (modern Colchester), previously the seat of his father Cunobelinus. Cunobelinus had died some time before the invasion. Caratacus and his brother Togodumnus led the initial defence of the country against Aulus Plautius's four legions, thought to have been around 40,000 men, primarily using guerrilla tactics. They lost much of the south-east after being defeated in two crucial battles, the Battle of the River Medway and River Thames. Togodumnus was killed (although both Miles Russell and John Hind argue that Dio was mistaken in reporting Togodumnus's death, that he was defeated but survived, and was later appointed by the Romans as a friendly king over a number of territories, becoming the loyal king referred to by Tacitus as Cogidubnus or Togidubnus) and the Catuvellauni's territories were conquered. Their stronghold of Camulodunon was converted into the first Roman colonia in Britain, Colonia Victricensis.

Resistance to Rome

We next hear of Caratacus in Tacitus's Annals, leading the Silures and Ordovices of Wales against Plautius's successor as governor, Publius Ostorius Scapula. Finally, in 50, Scapula managed to defeat Caratacus in a set-piece battle somewhere in Ordovician territory, capturing Caratacus's wife and daughter and receiving the surrender of his brothers. Caratacus himself escaped, and fled north to the lands of the Brigantes (modern Yorkshire) where the Brigantian queen, Cartimandua, handed him over to the Romans in chains. This was one of the factors that led to two Brigantian revolts against Cartimandua and her Roman allies, once later in the 50s and once in 69, led by Venutius, who had once been Cartimandua's husband. With the capture of Caratacus, much of southern Britain from the Humber to the Severn was pacified and garrisoned throughout the 50s.

Legends place Caratacus's last stand at either Caer Caradoc near Church Stretton or British Camp in the Malvern Hills, but the description of Tacitus makes either unlikely:

Although the Severn is visible from British Camp, it is nowhere near it, so this battle must have taken place elsewhere. A number of locations have been suggested, including a site near Brampton Bryan. Bari Jones, in Archaeology Today in 1998, identified Blodwel Rocks at Llanymynech in Powys as representing a close fit with Tacitus's account.

Captive in Rome
After his capture, Caratacus was sent to Rome as a war prize, presumably to be killed after a triumphal parade. Although a captive, he was allowed to address the Roman Senate. Tacitus records a version of his speech in which he says that his stubborn resistance made Rome's glory in defeating him all the greater:

He made such an impression that he was pardoned and allowed to live in peace in Rome. After his liberation, according to Dio Cassius, Caratacus was so impressed by the city of Rome that he said "And can you, then, who have got such possessions and so many of them, still covet our poor huts?"

Legend

Medieval Welsh traditions
Caratacus's memory may have been preserved in medieval Welsh tradition. A genealogy in the Welsh Harley MS 3859 includes the generations "Caratauc map Cinbelin map Teuhant", corresponding, via established processes of language change, to "Caratacus, son of Cunobelinus, son of Tasciovanus", preserving the names of the three historical figures in correct relationship.

Caratacus does not appear in Geoffrey of Monmouth's History of the Kings of Britain (1136), although he appears to correspond to Arviragus, the younger son of Kymbelinus, who continues to resist the Roman invasion after the death of his older brother Guiderius. In Welsh versions his name is Gweirydd, son of Cynfelyn, and his brother is called Gwydyr; the name Arviragus is taken from a poem by Juvenal.

Caradog, son of Bran, who appears in medieval Welsh literature, has also been identified with Caratacus, although nothing in the medieval legend corresponds except his name. He appears in the Mabinogion as a son of Bran the Blessed, who is left in charge of Britain while his father makes war in Ireland, but is overthrown by Caswallawn (the historical Cassivellaunus, who lived a century earlier than Caratacus). The Welsh Triads agree that he was Bran's son, and name two sons, Cawrdaf and Eudaf.

Two hills in Shropshire bear the name Caer Caradoc (Welsh – Caer Caradog), meaning fort of Caradoc, and have popular associations with him. One is an Iron Age hill fort and Scheduled Monument near the town of Clun. It overlooks the village of Chapel Lawn. The other Caer Caradoc is a prominent hill and Iron Age hill fort near Church Stretton, 16 miles (26 km) to the north-east.

Modern traditions
Caradog only began to be identified with Caratacus after the rediscovery of the works of Tacitus, and new material appeared based on this identification. An 18th-century tradition, popularised by the Welsh antiquarian and forger Iolo Morganwg, credits Caradog, on his return from imprisonment in Rome, with the introduction of Christianity to Britain. Iolo also makes the legendary king Coel Hen a son of Caradog's son Saint Cyllin. Richard Williams Morgan claimed that a reference to Cyllin as a son of Caratacus was found in the family records of Iestyn ab Gwrgant and used this as evidence of the early entry of Christianity to Britain:  "Cyllin ab Caradog, a wise and just king. In his days many of the Cymry embraced the faith in Christ through the teaching of the saints of Cor-Eurgain, and many godly men from the countries of Greece and Rome were in Cambria. He first of the Cymry gave infants names; for before, names were not given except to adults, and then from something characteristic in their bodies, minds, or manners."

Another tradition, which has remained popular among British Israelites and others, makes Caratacus already a Christian before he came to Rome, Christianity having been brought to Britain by either Joseph of Arimathea or St. Paul, and identifies a number of early Christians as his relatives.

One is Pomponia Graecina, wife of Aulus Plautius, the conqueror of Britain, who as Tacitus relates, was accused of following a "foreign superstition", which the tradition considers to be Christianity. Tacitus describes her as the "wife of the Plautius who returned from Britain with an ovation", which led John Lingard (1771–1851) to conclude, in his History and Antiquities of the Anglo-Saxon Church, that she was British; however, this conclusion is a misinterpretation of what Tacitus wrote. An ovation was a military parade in honour of a victorious general, so the person who "returned from Britain with an ovation" is clearly Plautius, not Pomponia. This has not prevented the error being repeated and disseminated widely.

Another is Claudia Rufina, a historical British woman known to the poet Martial. Martial describes Claudia's marriage to a man named Pudens, almost certainly Aulus Pudens, an Umbrian centurion and friend of the poet who appears regularly in his Epigrams. It has been argued since the 17th century that this pair may be the same as the Claudia and Pudens mentioned as members of the Roman Christian community in 2 Timothy in the New Testament. Some go further, claiming that Claudia was Caratacus' daughter, and that the historical Pope Linus, who is described as the "brother of Claudia" in an early church document, was Caratacus' son. Pudens is identified with St. Pudens, and it is claimed that the basilica of Santa Pudenziana in Rome, and with which St. Pudens is associated, was once called the Palatium Britannicum and was the home of Caratacus and his family.

This theory was popularised in a 1961 book called The Drama of the Lost Disciples by George Jowett, but Jowett did not originate it. He cites renaissance historians such as Archbishop James Ussher, Caesar Baronius and John Hardyng, as well as classical writers like Caesar, Tacitus and Juvenal, although his classical citations at least are wildly inaccurate, many of his assertions are unsourced, and many of his identifications entirely speculative. He also regularly cites St. Paul in Britain, an 1860 book by R. W. Morgan, and advocates other tenets of British Israelism, in particular that the British are descended from the lost tribes of Israel.

In the arts 

 Caratach is anachronistically depicted as Boudica's general in John Fletcher's play Bonduca (1613). The historical Caratach was exiled from Britain nearly a decade prior to Boudica's war.
 Caratacus is the subject of William Mason's 1759 poem of the same name and the 1776 play based on it.
 Caratacus is the title character of the Italian opera Carattaco by Johann Christian Bach, first performed in London in 1767
 A detailed knowledge of Caractacus' uniform is claimed by Major-General Stanley in "The Major-General's Song" from Gilbert and Sullivan's 1879 comic opera "The Pirates of Penzance".
 "Caractacus" is the title of a cantata by Edward Elgar in 1897–98 devoted to the defeat and capture of the king by the Romans. It was first performed at the Leeds choral festival in 1898.
 Caractacus is the subject of a Victorian poem called Caractacus the Briton by William Stewart Ross, published 1881 in a collection titled Lays of Romance and Chivalry, and distinguished by the refrain, "Caractacus the Briton, the bravest of the brave!"
 The defeat of Caradoc (Caratacus) by the Romans is the subject of Henry Treece's 1952 adult novel, The Dark Island,  the second book in his Celtic Tetralogy.  As well, a poem titled Caratacus appears in Treece's Exiles, a collection of poetry published in the same year.
Caractacus briefly appears as a minor character in the Robert Graves novel, Claudius the God.  In the television adaptation of Graves's novels, he is portrayed in a brief appearance by Peter Bowles.
Caratacus's capture and life as a captive in Rome is told from the point of view of his fictional daughter, Eigon, in Barbara Erskine's time-slip novel, The Warrior's Princess, pub. 2008.
Caratacus is a major character in Douglas Jackson's 2008 novel Claudius, the sequel to Caligula (2008).
Caradoc is a major character in author Pauline Gedge's 1978 novel, The Eagle and The Raven.
Caratacus appears in several volumes of Simon Scarrow's Eagle series, including Under the Eagle, The Eagle's Conquest, When the Eagle Hunts, The Eagle and the Wolves, The Eagle's Prey, Blood Crows and Brothers In Blood.
Caradoc is a main character in Manda Scott's series "Boudica" ("Dreaming the Eagle", "Dreaming the Bull", "Dreaming the Hound", "Dreaming the Serpent-Spear").
Caratach appears as a stage character in Harry Turtledove's alternate history novel Ruled Britannia. In this novel, a fictional version of William Shakespeare writes a play called Boudicca, which is almost identical to John Fletcher's Bonduca. In the book's afterword Turtledove acknowledges Fletcher's influence, but in the novel itself he mistakenly suggests that Caratach was depicted as Boudicca's man in Tacitus's "Annals.
 Caratacus was the subject of the 1964 comedy song "The Court of King Caractacus" by Rolf Harris.
Caratacus is referenced in the Paradox Interactive video game Crusader Kings II in the form of bloodline inherited by some characters in the game, the "Bloodline of Caradog".
Ellis Owen Ellis (Ellis Bryn-Coch) the Welsh artist, was a portrait painter who won a number of prizes in London shortly after 1834, Caradog before Caesar in Rome was one of his works.
"The Court of King Caractacus" is a nonsense song by disgraced entertainer Rolf Harris. The single reached No 9 in the Australian Singles Chart in 1964.

 See also 
 Caratacus Stone
 Vercingetorix, king and chieftain of the Gallic Arverni tribe which revolted against Rome during the last phase of Julius Caesar's Gallic Wars in 52 BCE.

References

Further reading
 Leonard Cottrell, The Roman Invasion of Britain, Barnes & Noble. New York, 1992
 Sheppard Frere, Britannia: a History of Roman Britain'', Pimlico, 1991

External links

 Caractacus at resourcesforhistory.com
 Caratacus at Encyclopaedia Romana
 Caratacus and the Catuvellauni at Roman-Britain.co.uk

Briton rulers
Celtic warriors
1st-century monarchs in Europe
AD 10 births
1st-century deaths
Year of birth uncertain
Year of death unknown